Larry Hess (born May 3, 1935) is a retired NASCAR Winston Cup Series driver whose career spanned from 1965 to 1969. His choice of vehicles ranged from a Ford to a Rambler and even the occasional Dodge vehicle.

Career
He managed to complete 4357 laps - earning $17,134 in the process ($ when adjusted for inflation). After starting an average of 27th place and finishing an average of 21st place, Hess managed to pick up three "top ten" finishes in 1965 (Atlanta 500, World 600, and the Firecracker 400). Hess' worst seasons were in 1967 and 1968 where he finished 109th in the overall standings.

Hess drove for himself as an owner-driver for 25 races while doing a single race (1965 Tidewater 300) for NASCAR owner Jim Tatum. His earnings as an owner were $14,245 after achieving three finishes in the "top ten" ($ when adjusted for inflation). Cars under Hess' ownership started at an average of 25th place and finished an average of 20th place - achieving better results than his personal driving career.

References

1935 births
Living people
NASCAR drivers
NASCAR team owners
People from Salisbury, North Carolina
Racing drivers from North Carolina